The Melovatka or Melovatsskaya Formation is a Cenomanian geologic formation in Russia. Pterosaur fossils have been recovered from the formation.

Description 
The two phosphorite horizons are separated in places by a yellowish sand interbed up to 1 m thick; however, they sometimes merge into a single horizon. The lower interbed or part of the integrated phosphorite horizon shows in places straight diagonal bedding, which is manifested in the orientation of almost flat pellets, pebbles, and pseudomorphs on bivalve shells. The phosphate concretions are irregular aggregates and rounded pebbles, ranging in size from several millimeters to 5–10 cm. They are dark brown or nearly black.

Fossil content 
The following vertebrate fossils were reported from the formation:

 Cerebavis cenomanica
 Cretolamna appendiculata
 Edaphodon sedgwicki
 Elasmodectes kiprijanoffi
 Elasmodus sinzovi
 Eostriatolamia subulata
 Ischyodus latus
 Paraorthacodus recurvus
 Pseudoisurus denticulatus
 Synechodus dispar
 Lonchodectes sp.
 Odontaspis sp.
 Polyacrodus sp.
 Squatina sp.
 ?Platypterygius sp.
 Chelonioidea indet.
 Chimaeridae indet.
 Elasmosauridae indet.
 Enchodontidae indet.
 Ornithocheiroidea indet.
 Osteichthyes indet.
 Pliosauridae indet.

See also 
 List of pterosaur-bearing stratigraphic units
 List of fossiliferous stratigraphic units in Russia
 Sekmenevsk Formation

References 

Geologic formations of Russia
Cretaceous Russia
Cenomanian Stage
Sandstone formations
Phosphorite formations
Paleontology in Russia
Geology of European Russia
Geography of Volgograd Oblast